Zhou Tao (born 23 March 1968) is a Chinese television host and actress.

She won the Das Erste Golden Crown for Best Host in 1999, the Golden Mike Awards for Television in 1999 and 2003, and received the Golden Eagle Award for Best Programme Host in 2003.

Biography
Zhou was born in Huainan, Anhui, China in 1968, she graduated from Communication University of China, where she majored in broadcast.

From 1993 to 1995, Zhou worked in Beijing Television, she hosted Beijing News.

From 1995 to present, Zhou worked as a host at China Central Television.

Zhou hosted the CCTV New Year's Gala from 1996 to 2011 and 2016.

Works

Television
 True Love Forever

Film

Awards
 1999 Das Erste – Golden Crown for Best Host
 1999 Golden Mike Award
 2003 Golden Mike Award
 2003 Golden Eagle Award for Best Programme Host

Personal life
Zhou is twice married. She was originally wed to Yao Ke, who is a host in China National Radio. After a turbulent divorce, she remarried Lu Yun, her second husband, a businessman.

References

1968 births
People from Huaihua
Communication University of China alumni
CCTV television presenters
Living people
Hosts of the CCTV New Year's Gala